Leonard Austin Chalmers (4 September 1936 – 10 February 2014) was an English footballer who played in the Football League for Leicester City and Notts County.

Chalmers played for Corby Town before signing for Leicester City in 1956. Nicknamed 'Chopper' for his fully committed playing style, Chalmers played 80 minutes of the 1961 FA Cup Final hobbling on the wing after suffering a badly gashed shin which rendered him no more than nuisance value as no substitutions were then allowed. Leicester City lost 2–0 to Tottenham Hotspur. After leaving Notts County, he played non-league football for Dunstable Town.

Chalmers died on 10 February 2014 at the age of 77. Leicester City held a minute's applause before their home game with Ipswich Town on 22 February, with Chalmers' family in attendance.

References

1936 births
2014 deaths
People from Geddington
English footballers
Association football defenders
Corby Town F.C. players
Leicester City F.C. players
Notts County F.C. players
English Football League players
FA Cup Final players